A rhinestone, paste or diamante is a diamond simulant originally made from rock crystal but since the 19th century from crystal glass or polymers such as acrylic.

Origins 
Originally, rhinestones were rock crystals gathered from the river Rhine, hence the name, although some were also found in areas like the Alps (the source of the Rhine). Today the name "rhinestone" applies only to varieties of lead glass known as crystal glass. The availability of such products increased greatly in the 18th century when the  Alsatian jeweller Georg Friedrich Strass (1701-1773) developed imitation diamonds by coating the lower side of lead glass with metal powder. Many European languages use the word strass (or equivalent) to refer to rhinestones.

As opposed to the classic rhinestones, which had a metal-powder coating on the bottom side only, several companies have opted to mass-produce iridescent lead glass by reducing the metal-coating thickness and applying it uniformly, not using metal powder with a binder but applying various forms of metal deposition (thin foil, vapor deposition, etc). Such developments include Favrile glass by  Tiffany in 1894, Carnival glass under the name "Iridrill" by Fenton in 1908, "Aurora Borealis" glass by Swarovski in 1956 and  PVD-coated dichroic glass in the late 20th century, amongst many other decorative lead glasses coated with a thin metal layer and sold under various commercial names such as "rainbow glass", "aurora glass" and such.

Rhinestones can be used as imitations of diamonds, and some manufacturers even manage to partially reproduce the glistening effect which real diamonds have in the sun.

Compositions 

Typically, crystal rhinestones have been used on costumes, apparel and jewelry. Crystal rhinestones are produced mainly in Austria by Swarovski and in the Czech Republic by Preciosa and a few other glassworks in northern Bohemia. In the US, these are sometimes called "Austrian crystal".

The rhinestone-studded Nudie suit was invented by Nudie Cohn in the 1940s, an Americanization of the matador's "suit of lights". Rhinestone material is often used as an alternative to sequins.

In popular culture 

Liberal use of rhinestones was associated with country music singers, as well as with singer Elvis Presley and pianist Liberace. In 1974 David Allan Coe released the album The Mysterious Rhinestone Cowboy and referred to himself as The Rhinestone Cowboy again in the 1977 song "Longhaired Redneck". In 1975 Glen Campbell had a top hit with the song "Rhinestone Cowboy" and became known as the "Rhinestone Cowboy". That song served as the basis for the 1984 movie Rhinestone, starring Sylvester Stallone and Dolly Parton. The British virtual band Gorillaz has also released a single by the name of "Rhinestone Eyes" in 2010. The closing track on Madvillain's Madvillainy is called "Rhinestone Cowboy". Carrie Underwood's ninth album, released in 2022, is called Denim & Rhinestones.

Sizing guide
Rhinestones are sized by using the term "ss", or stone size, following a number to indicate size (e.g. 8ss is equivalent to 2.3 mm diameter, 10ss is 2.8 mm). SS is more commonly used for apparel means, while PP (or pearl plate) is used for jewelry.

Hot-fix rhinestones
Hot-fix rhinestones, also called heat-transfer rhinestones, are mainly used for apparel. The flat bottom of the stone has a glue backing and, when heated, melts onto the surface of the clothing. These can be adhered using a regular iron, although it is recommended to use a heat press, as they are able to reach higher temperatures (standard transfers require temperatures of up to ) while applying heavy pressures resulting in a more professional quality.

References

External links 

Glass applications
Glass art
Diamond simulants
History of glass
Jewellery components